The 1967 Pau Grand Prix was a Formula Two motor race held on 4 April 1967 at the Pau circuit, in Pau, Pyrénées-Atlantiques, France. The Grand Prix was won by Jochen Rindt, driving the Brabham BT23. Denny Hulme finished second and Alan Rees third.

Classification

Race

References

Pau Grand Prix
1967 in French motorsport